Kate Clifton Osgood Holmes (October 1, 1858 – April 19, 1925) was an American painter and scientific illustrator.

Life 
Kate Clifton Osgood Holmes was born in Castine, Maine, October 1, 1858. She was one of five children born to James Blake Osgood and Cornelia Adams Upham.She moved with her family to Ellsworth by the age of two; some sources list Ellsworth as her birthplace, and indeed she herself gave it as such on a passport application in 1908. They moved again, to Washington, D.C., around 1862.

She studied at the Art Students League of New York, under William Merritt Chase.  In 1883, she married Dr. William Henry Holmes. She studied in Europe for a year before returning to the United States; she taught decorative arts in local schools around Washington, including the Madeira School, for a number of years thereafter. 
She lectured a great deal as well. 
She was employed by the Bureau of Ethnology of the Smithsonian Institution from 1881 to 1883, and remained active with the Smithsonian for much of her career. Holmes died in Washington, D.C. One of her paintings, Summer, and a drawing of a priest are currently in the collection of the Smithsonian American Art Museum.

References

External links
 https://americanart.si.edu/artist/kate-clifton-osgood-holmes-2277
 https://www.askart.com/artist_bio/Kate_Clifton_Osgood_Holmes/10025621/Kate_Clifton_Osgood_Holmes.aspx
Biodiversity Heritage Library Flickr

Further reading
Books mentioning Kate Osgood Holmes include:
 Dictionary of Women Artists. An international dictionary of women artists born before 1900. By Chris Petteys. Boston: G.K. Hall & Co., 1985.
 Who Was Who in American Art. Compiled from the original thirty-four volumes of American Art Annual: Who's Who in Art, Biographies of American Artists Active from 1898 to 1947. Edited by Peter Hastings Falk. Madison, CT: Sound View Press, 1985.
 Woman's Who's Who of America. A biographical dictionary of contemporary women of the United States and Canada, 1914–1915. Edited by John William Leonard. New York: American Commonwealth Co., 1914.
 Who Was Who in American Art. 400 years of artists in America. Second edition. Three volumes. Edited by Peter Hastings Falk. Madison, CT: Sound View Press, 1999.

1858 births
1925 deaths
American women painters
19th-century American painters
19th-century American women artists
20th-century American painters
20th-century American women artists
People from Ellsworth, Maine
Painters from Maine
Painters from Washington, D.C.
Smithsonian Institution people
Art Students League of New York alumni
Students of William Merritt Chase
People from Castine, Maine